Cagnac-les-Mines is a commune in the Tarn department in southern France.

It is a former coalmining town for workers of the Compagnie minière de Carmaux. It has a mining museum, whereupon is standing a huge miners safety lamp.

Geography
The Vère forms part of the commune's north-western border.

See also
Communes of the Tarn department

References

Communes of Tarn (department)